RS McColl, colloquially known as McColl's, is a Scottish newsagent company named after Robert Smyth McColl, who was a professional footballer. It was founded in 1901 by McColl and his brother Tom.

RS McColl is a trading name of McColl's, a subsidiary for the British Supermarket chain Morrisons. It has been a prominent Scottish confectioner and newsagent and has been owned in the past by Cadburys and the Southland Corporation of America (7-Eleven).

Business background and history

In November 1998, RS McColl became part of TM Retail when Forbuoys (a subsidiary of TM Retail) acquired Martin Retail Group, creating Great Britain's largest chain of newsagents. In addition to RS McColl, TM Retail's former trading names include; Forbuoys, Martin's, Dillons (purchased from One Stop Stores Ltd following the takeover by Tesco of parent company T&S Stores), McColls and More.

In 2006, TM Retail was renamed Martin McColl Limited, after a management buyout. The various stores were then rebranded variously as Martin's (news and variety stores) or McColl's (convenience stores). The only exceptions were the Scottish stores where the RS McColl name was retained. With this rebranding, all other names the company operates under were removed, these included Martins the Newsagents, More, Forbuoys and Dillons.

From 2009 to 2010, Martin McColl Limited replaced their existing EPOS system with a new multi-screen touch screen system. It was hoped this would speed up the transaction process by incorporating Credit/Debit card systems within the EPOS. The multi-screen system allows advertising POS to be electronically displayed to customers during the time that they are at the till. By 2011, an expansion for the new system had been developed, with the addition of built-in PayPoint terminals known as PPOD.

In March 2013, Martin McColl's implemented a company-wide change in the colouring of SEL's and POS, opting for 'ivory' SEL strips and a mixture of block-coloured red and white POS material.

In August 2013, the group changed its name from Martin McColl Retail Group to McColls Retail Group.

Covid-19 pandemic
In February 2020, McColl's announced its intentions to close down 330 stores over the next three or four years while it aims to concentrate its consumer retail business operations. McColl's is to change the attention from newsagents to bigger grocery stores after writing down the valuation of its company has brought the chain to a loss, with its dividend suspended as well.

Morrisons Daily
After having Morrisons' Safeway brand on around 400 product lines in over 1,300 stores since January 2018, McColl's decided to take the wholesale agreement further by having 350 of their convenience stores rebranded from McColl's to Morrisons Daily. The first rebranded stores were operating at the start of 2021, with the 100th rebranded store opening in Ellesmere Port in October 2021. McColl's hopes to have all of the 350 shops trading under the new format by the end of 2022.

References

External links
 

Supermarkets of the United Kingdom
Retail companies of the United Kingdom
Convenience stores
1901 establishments in Scotland
Retail companies established in 1901